Kaliningrad is a Baltic port city in Kaliningrad Oblast, Russia.

Kaliningrad may also refer to:
Kaliningrad Oblast, a federal subject of Russia
Kaliningrad Special Region, a military district of the Russian Armed Forces which existed in 1997–2010
Kaliningrad, name of the city of Korolyov, Russia between 1938 and 1996
Kaliningrad Railway, a subsidiary of the Russian Railways
Kaliningrad K-5 (missile), a model of Soviet air-to-air missile
Kaliningrad K-8 (missile), a model of Soviet air-to-air missile
RFS Kaliningrad, a Ropucha-class landing ship in the Russian Navy

See also
Kaliningradsky (disambiguation)